Coventry North East is a constituency represented in the House of Commons of the UK Parliament from the 2015 general election by Colleen Fletcher of the Labour Party.

Members of Parliament

Constituency profile
In the seat is a wide demographic mix: across it is scattered an above UK average level of social housing and unemployment claimants. However, income is close to the UK average. The constituency has a large ethnic minority population, consisting mainly of Sikhs and Muslims; one ward, Foleshill, has a majority ethnic minority population.

Boundaries

Based entirely within the borough of Coventry, the seat of Coventry North East includes the Stoke, Walsgrave-on-Sowe, Wyken, Longford, and Foleshill areas of the cathedral city.

1997–present: The City of Coventry wards of Foleshill, Henley, Longford, Lower Stoke, Upper Stoke, and Wyken.

1983–1997: The City of Coventry wards of Foleshill, Henley, Longford, Upper Stoke, and Wyken.

1974–1983: The County Borough of Coventry wards of Foleshill, Henley, Longford, Upper Stoke, and Wyken.

History
Since its 1974 creation, the area has been a Labour Party stronghold, with the Conservative Party finishing second. The Liberal Democrats (including their two predecessor parties) amassed their largest shares of the vote in 1983 and in 2010, on 16.6% of the vote. In 2010, between 2% and 5% of the vote went to British National Party, Socialist and UKIP candidates. Completing the choice of seven was a Christian party candidate, who attracted the fewest votes.

Elections

Elections in the 2010s

Elections in the 2000s

Elections in the 1990s

Elections in the 1980s

Elections in the 1970s

See also
 List of parliamentary constituencies in the West Midlands (county)

Notes

References

Parliamentary constituencies in Coventry
Constituencies of the Parliament of the United Kingdom established in 1974